The Miller-Martin Town House is a historic house in Clayton, Alabama, U.S.. It was built as a townhouse for John H. Miller in 1859, and it was designed in the Gothic Revival architectural style. In 1871, it was purchased by Judge Henry Clinton Russell, who served on Barbour County's probate court. In 1915, it was purchased by John Council Martin, who went on to serve as the mayor of Clayton from 1926 to 1930. It was later inherited by his daughter. It has been listed on the National Register of Historic Places since December 16, 1974.

References

Houses on the National Register of Historic Places in Alabama
Gothic Revival architecture in Alabama
Houses completed in 1859
Houses in Barbour County, Alabama